Provincial Highway 30 is a 35.433-kilometer highway, which starts from Zhuoxi, Hualien and ends in Changbin, Taitung. This highway passes through Hai'an Range from the Pacific coast to the Huatung Valley and connects Provincial Highway No.11 and Provincial Highway No.9. 

Section:Yuchang Highway: Yuli, Hualien - Changbin, Taitung.

See also
 Highway system in Taiwan

External links

Highways in Taiwan